The Fighting Brothers is a 1919 American short silent Western film directed by John Ford. The film is now considered to be lost.

Cast
 Pete Morrison as Sheriff Pete Larkin
 Hoot Gibson as Lonnie Larkin
 Yvette Mitchell as Conchita
 Jack Woods as Ben Crawly
 Duke R. Lee as Slim

See also
 List of American films of 1919
 Hoot Gibson filmography

References

External links
 

1919 films
1919 short films
American silent short films
American black-and-white films
1919 Western (genre) films
Films directed by John Ford
Lost Western (genre) films
Lost American films
1919 lost films
Silent American Western (genre) films
1910s American films
1910s English-language films